Andrew Arnautov (also known as Andrew Valentine; born August 27, 1967; Rostov-on-Don, RSFSR) — American and Ukrainian jazz musician, music producer, virtuoso jazz bassist.

Life and career 
In 1983 Andrew Arnautov had started his music education at Rostov College of Arts jazz department on bass guitar and double bass. In 1986 he was transferred to Gnesins State College of Music continuing his formal training. While studying in Moscow Andrew met David Friesen during his USSR tour with Paul Horn. In 1990 after graduation from Gnesins State College of Music with BA degree in music performance Andrew Arnautov relocated to the United States. In 1991 he was granted a full Berklee College of Music scholarship. At Berklee he studied bass with Oscar Stagnaro and became fond of Afro-Cuban music, Latin Jazz and Salsa. During Boston period he occasionally performed with trumpeter Roy Hargrove, Latin Jazz vibraphonist Victor Mendoza. In the late 1990's Andrew formed a Latin Jazz & Salsa band called "West End Mambo".
Since 2002 after relocating to Ukraine Andrew has become a frequent guest at various European jazz festivals with his original projects, as well as a sideman for featured guest stars. In 2005 he performed at the international music festival "Jazz Koktebel 2005" with his "Valentine Quartet" featuring Lew Soloff on trumpet. In 2008 he recorded an album with Sonny Rollins' pianist Mark Soskin.

In 2013 Andrew was a studio musician for Ukrainian historical drama "The Guide" and appeared in the movie as a double bass player.

In 2016 he performed in a duo project with David Friesen at music festival . The next year he became an arranger of Friesen's original music written for brass orchestra, which was performed by National Academic Symphonic Band of Ukraine in May, 2017.

Since 2017 Andrew is regularly cooperating with the son of Ray Brown and Ella Fitzgerald — Ray Brown Jr.  In 2018 he recorded an album with R. Brown Jr.  The same year Arnautov became a bandleader and composer at Ukrainian "Late Night Show with ". In 2020 the album "Testimony" of David Friesen original music was released with Arnautov's arrangements and orchestration for Brass Orchestra and Quartet.

Discography 
1994 —  Trio "Noble Cause"

2000 — Clare Fader "The Elephant's Baby"

2000 — Greg Hyslop "Greg Hyslop Trio" (with Andrew Valentine on bass in "How insensitive")

2006 — Andrew Valentine "Compiled over the years"

2008 — Alex Fantaev, Andrew Arnautov, Mark Soskin, Dmitry 'Bobeen' Alexandrov "SkhidSide meets Mark Soskin"

2008 — "Compilation: Bass Kolo"

2013 — Andrew Arnautov "Manifestations"

2018 — Ray Brown Jr. "This is Ray Brown Jr."

2020 — David Friesen "Testimony"

See also
List of jazz bassists

References 

Living people
1967 births